Henry Schneider Building, also known as the Monarch Machine Co., Main Street Garage, Cities Service Co. Station, and Herrick & Edwards Tires, is a historic commercial building located at Springfield, Greene County, Missouri. It was built about 1928, and remodeled to its present form in 1952.  It is a one-story, brick commercial building with a flat roof and concrete foundation.  The building housed multiple automobile related businesses from the time it was constructed into modern times.

It was listed on the National Register of Historic Places in 2006.

References

Commercial buildings on the National Register of Historic Places in Missouri
Commercial buildings completed in 1928
Buildings and structures in Springfield, Missouri
National Register of Historic Places in Greene County, Missouri